Tuvaijuittuq Marine Protected Area is a marine protected area located off the northwest coast of Ellesmere Island in Nunavut, Canada. The goal of the marine protected area is to protect the rich biodiversity and dynamism of the High Arctic sea ice ecosystem. It is part of a large permafrost region called the Last Ice Area that covers the northern Greenland and the Canadian Arctic Archipelago.

History
Tuvaijuittuq was established by ministerial order under the Oceans Act for interim protection on 21 August 2019. Under the order, no new or additional human activities will be allowed to occur in the area for up to five years while the Qikiqtani Inuit Association, the Government of Nunavut, and the Government of Canada work to establish long-term protection of the area. Exceptions to this rule include respecting Inuit rights to harvest wildlife under the Nunavut Agreement, scientific research, activities relating to national security and emergencies, and the safe passage of foreign ships through the region.

Geography
The northwest coast of Ellesmere Island is dominated by thick, multi-year pack ice created by the circulation of the Beaufort Gyre.

Ecology
Sea ice provides habitat for ice-adapted organisms within the neritic and pelagic zones of the area, most notably ice algae. In addition, seabed communities in this area exhibits higher that expected levels of biodiversity and biological productivity.

See also
Tallurutiup Imanga National Marine Conservation Area

References

Marine Protected Areas of Canada
Nature reserves in Nunavut
Protected areas established in 2019